The Association of Certified Fraud Examiners (ACFE) is a professional organization of fraud examiners. Its activities include producing fraud information, tools and training.  Based in Austin, Texas, the ACFE was founded in 1988 by Joseph T. Wells. The ACFE grants the professional designation of Certified Fraud Examiner (abbreviated CFE).

Founder 
Joseph T. Wells founded the ACFE and is its chairman. After graduating from the University of Oklahoma, he worked for ten years with the Federal Bureau of Investigation, during which time he investigated the former Attorney General John N. Mitchell's involvement in Watergate.

In addition to his duties as chairman, Wells writes, researches and lectures to business and professional groups on white-collar crime issues. He has written books and articles on fraud prevention and detection. His writings appear in professional journals.

Global Fraud Conference 
With companies losing up to 5% of annual revenue to occupational fraud, the ability to detect and deter fraud is critical. Due to this, the ACFE created the largest anti-fraud conference in the world as an opportunity for those interested in developing the appropriate tools to combat fraud. The 32nd ACFE Global Fraud Conference was to be held in Las Vegas on June 20–25, 2021.

Past ACFE Global Fraud Conferences 
 20th ACFE Global Fraud Conference (2009) • Las Vegas, Nevada
 21st ACFE Global Fraud Conference (2010) • Washington, D.C.
 22nd ACFE Global Fraud Conference (2011) • San Diego, California
 23rd ACFE Global Fraud Conference (2012) • Orlando, Florida
 24th ACFE Global Fraud Conference (2013) • Las Vegas, Nevada
 25th ACFE Global Fraud Conference (2014) • San Antonio, Texas
 26th ACFE Global Fraud Conference (2015) • Baltimore, Maryland
 27th ACFE Global Fraud Conference (2016) • Las Vegas, Nevada
 28th ACFE Global Fraud Conference (2017) • Nashville, Tennessee
 29th ACFE Global Fraud Conference (2018) • Las Vegas, Nevada
 30th ACFE Global Fraud Conference (2019) • Austin, Texas
 31st ACFE Global Fraud Conference (2020) • Boston, Massachusetts

Fraud museum
The ACFE runs a fraud museum containing exhibits linked to famous frauds, which is open to the public. America's Guide to Fraud Prevention, written by the famous confidence trickster Steve Comisar, is on display in the ACFE fraud museum. The book is considered a piece of fraud history.

See also
Frankensteins of Fraud, published by the ACFE
Fraud Advisory Panel charity, corporate member organisations

References

External links 

Fraud Magazine
ACFE Annual Fraud Conference
ACFE Report to the Nations

Fraud in the United States
Professional associations based in the United States
Organizations established in 1988
Auditing in the United States
1988 establishments in the United States
Fraud organizations